Lone Star Pioneers is a 1939 American Western film directed by Joseph Levering and written by Nate Gatzert. The film stars Wild Bill Elliott, Dorothy Gulliver, Lee Shumway, Slim Whitaker, Charles King and Jack Ingram. The film was released on March 16, 1939, by Columbia Pictures.

Plot

Cast          
Wild Bill Elliott as Pat Barrett
Dorothy Gulliver as Virginia Crittenden
Lee Shumway as Bill Ruphy
Slim Whitaker as Buck Bally 
Charles King as Pike
Jack Ingram as John Coe
Harry Harvey Sr. as Eph Brown
Buzz Barton as Chuck
Frank LaRue as Joe Cribben

References

External links
 

1939 films
American Western (genre) films
1939 Western (genre) films
Columbia Pictures films
Films directed by Joseph Levering
American black-and-white films
1930s English-language films
1930s American films